Ivan Dodig and Marcelo Melo were the defending champions, but Dodig chose not to participate this year. Melo played alongside Vasek Pospisil, but lost to John Peers and Henri Kontinen in the semifinals.

Kontinen and Peers won the title, defeating top seeds Pierre-Hugues Herbert and Nicolas Mahut in the final, 6–4, 3–6, [10–6].

Seeds
All seeds received a bye into the second round.

Draw

Finals

Top half

Bottom half

References
 Main Draw

Doubles